Gerkens is a surname. Notable people with the surname include:

 Jacob F. Gerkens (1842–?), German-born American police chief
 Pieter Gerkens (born 1995), Belgian footballer
  (born 1957), Belgian politician

See also
 Gerken